This page shows the results of the Cycling Competition at the 1951 Pan American Games, held from February 25 to March 3, 1951 in Buenos Aires, Argentina. There were a total number of eight medal events, with only men competing.

Track cycling

Men's 1000m Match Sprint (Track)

Men's 1000m Time Trial (Track)

Men's 40-lap Australian Pursuit (Track)

Men's 4000m Individual Pursuit (Track)

Men's 4000m Team Pursuit (Track)

Road cycling

Men's Individual Race (Road)

Men's Individual Time Trial (Road)

Men's Team Race (Road)

References

  .
 
 
 

`
1951
Cycling
Pan American Games
Pan American Games
Pan American Games
1951 Pan American Games